James Chester Brandenburg (October 15, 1897 – July 17, 1974) was an American actor and stuntman. He appeared in 436 films and television programs between 1924 and 1968.

Brandenburg was born in Peoria, Illinois and died in Woodland Hills, Los Angeles. He was the brother of actor Ed Brandenburg. 

Brandenburg appeared on the TV western series Gunsmoke, in numerous uncredited roles, including as a townsman in the 1960 episode “The Blacksmith” (S6E2), the 1962 episode “False Front” (S18E15) & the 1963 episode “Kate Heller” (S9E1); as a party guest in the episode “Say Uncle” (S6 E4).

Selected filmography

 Wide Open Spaces (1924)
 Official Officers (1925)
 Good Cheer (1926)
 War Feathers (1926)
 With Love and Hisses (1927)
 Putting Pants on Philip (1927)
 Playin' Hookey (1928)
 You're Darn Tootin' (1928)
 Should Married Men Go Home? (1928)
 Two Tars (1928)
 Cat, Dog & Co. (1929)
 When the Wind Blows (1930)
 Be Big! (1931)
 Pack Up Your Troubles (1932)
 Sons of the Desert (1933)
 The Pinch Singer (1936)
 The Adventures of Robin Hood (1938)
 Dodge City (1939)
 They Drive By Night (1940)
 The Remarkable Andrew (1942)
 The Ghost of Frankenstein (1942)
 Jitterbugs (1943)
 Hers to Hold (1943)
 Wing and a Prayer (1944)
 The Harvey Girls (1946)
 The Kid from Brooklyn (1946)
 The Sea of Grass (1947)
 Nightmare Alley (1947)
 Station West (1948)
 White Heat (1949) - Convict (uncredited)
 The Yellow Cab Man (1950)
 The Asphalt Jungle (1950)
 The Red Badge of Courage (1951)
 The Big Trees (1952)
 Hans Christian Andersen (1952)
 The War of the Worlds (1953) - Man in Church (uncredited)
 Calamity Jane (1953)
 20,000 Leagues Under the Sea (1954) - Sailor (uncredited)
 Seven Men from Now (1956)
 The Spirit of St. Louis (1957)
 The Sheepman (1958)
 The Young Philadelphians (1959)
 North to Alaska (1960)
 Judgment at Nuremberg (1961)
 The Man Who Shot Liberty Valance (1962)
 Ride the High Country (1962)

References

External links

American male television actors
American male film actors
American male silent film actors
1897 births
1974 deaths
20th-century American male actors
Burials at Forest Lawn Memorial Park (Hollywood Hills)
Hal Roach Studios actors
Western (genre) television actors